Tropical Cyclone Alibera was the second longest-lasting tropical cyclone on record in the south-west Indian Ocean, with a duration of 22 days. It formed on December 16, 1989, well to the northeast of Madagascar. For several days, it meandered southwestward while gradually intensifying. After drifting erratically for several days, the storm began a steady southwest motion on December 29 as a greatly weakened system. On January 1, Alibera struck southeastern Madagascar near Mananjary, having re-intensified to just below tropical cyclone status. It weakened over land but again restrengthened upon reaching open waters on January 3. The storm turned to the southeast, then to the southwest, and finally back to the southeast, dissipating on January 5.

Early in its duration, Alibera produced gusty winds in the Seychelles. Upon moving ashore in Madagascar, the cyclone lashed coastal cities with heavy rainfall and up to 250-km/h (150-mph) wind gusts. In Mananjary, nearly every building was damaged or destroyed, and locals considered it the worst storm since 1925. Across the region, the cyclone destroyed large areas of crops, thousands of houses, and several roads and bridges. Alibera killed 46 people and left 55,346 people homeless. After the storm, the Malagasy government requested for international assistance.

Meteorological history

The first named storm of the season, Tropical Cyclone Alibera, formed on December 16 about halfway between Tromelin Island and Diego Garcia as a tropical disturbance. It originated from the Intertropical Convergence Zone and initially consisted of a spiral area of thunderstorms. The system moved erratically, first to the southwest, then to the southeast, and later curving back to the west, steered by a ridge to the southeast. The MFR is the official Regional Specialized Meteorological Center for the basin. As a result, the Mauritius Meteorological Service named the storm Alibera. Also on December 18, the Joint Typhoon Warning Center (JTWC), a joint United States Navy and Air Force task force issuing cyclone warnings for the region, assessed that the storm had winds equivalent to a minimal hurricane in a post-storm analysis. While the storm was active, however, the JTWC did not begin advisories until the following day.

Alibera quickly intensified, attaining tropical cyclone status on December 20 while southwest of Agaléga. This is equivalent to a super typhoon, which made Alibera tied for the strongest cyclone in the southern hemisphere that season, along with Cyclone Alex in the Australian basin. On December 21, Alibera turned sharply to the south and slowly weakened. On the next day, the storm curved to an eastward drift as a downgraded severe tropical storm, its path influenced by ridges to the east and west. It maintained its intensity for the next several days, turning back to the south on December 24 and slowly recurving to the west. However, the movement was erratic, and the storm executed four small loops. Although the MFR had forecasting difficulties during this time, the storm remained far enough to the north of the Mascarene Islands to limit rainfall warnings.

On December 29, Alibera began a steady track to the southwest after the ridge weakened, and briefly deteriorated to minimal tropical storm status. However, it re-intensified to just shy of tropical cyclone status on January 1. The storm quickly weakened over land, but again restrengthened upon reaching the Mozambique Channel on January 3. This was short-lived, as Alibera weakened back to tropical depression status by January 5. The storm moved to the southeast, turned to the southwest, and finally back to the southeast before dissipating on January 7, having been swept into the westerlies.

Alibera was the second longest-lasting tropical cyclone in the basin since the start of satellite imagery, with a duration of 22 days. Only Cyclone Georgette in 1968 lasted longer at 24 days. After Alibera, the only storm to approach Alibera's duration was Cyclone Leon–Eline in 2000, which lasted 21 days in the basin (29 days overall).

Impact and aftermath
Before Alibera affected Madagascar, it produced winds of tropical cyclone force in the Seychelles.

There, nearly every building was damaged or destroyed, including hospitals, government offices, and schools. About 80% of houses were destroyed. The cyclone shut down the city's water system, disrupted access to the ocean, cut communications, and blocked or damaged most roads. There were 15 deaths in Mananjary alone. The storm damage in Mananjary prevented ships from delivering supplies. Residents in the region considered the storm to be the worst since 1925.

Elsewhere in southern Madagascar, the cyclone damaged about 70% of the buildings in Nosy Varika and 15% of Ivohibe. In the former town, many schools and houses were destroyed, leaving thousands homeless, and 4,230 houses were destroyed in Vohipeno. Strong winds damaged walls and roofs in several other towns in Fianarantsoa Province. The offshore island of Île Sainte-Marie sustained heavy damage. Across Fianarantsoa Province, Alibera destroyed  of rice, corn, coffee, bananas, and vegetables, although most of the damage was to the rice crop. Areas in southeastern Madagascar experienced heavy rainfall, which flooded rivers and canals in Fianarantsoa Province. Across the region, 23 roads were cut or damaged, totaling  of roads in need of repairs. This included a  portion of a mountain road that was destroyed, as well as a damaged section of Route nationale 7. In Vohipeno, the floods destroyed 13 bridges, and a bridge was damaged in Ifanadiana. The cyclone also cut a portion of the Fianarantsoa-Côte Est railway, thus disrupting regional economic activity. Across Madagascar, Alibera killed 46 people and left 55,346 homeless.

On January 18, the Malagasy government issued an appeal to the international community for assistance. The Office of the United Nations Disaster Relief Coordinator provided $15,000 (USD) in emergency funding to purchase immediate supplies. The United States sent $20,000 to rebuild schools and hospitals. Other countries donated $135,000 in supplies or cash, including $82,000 from Japan and $23,000 from the United Kingdom. In Mananjary, the local government provided  of rice to affected families, while the national government provided other relief goods to the city after roads were cleared. After the storm, a school in Farafangana housed 900 locals who were left homeless. Existing food supplies were sufficient to feed affected residents after the storm passed.

See also
Cyclone Gretelle – Powerful cyclone that struck a similar part of Madagascar in 1997

References

Alibera
Alibera